Waugh Pocket is a locality in the Cairns Region, Queensland, Australia.

Geography 

Waugh Pocket is bounded to the north-east by the Bruce Highway. It consists of a mixture of lower-lying land (about 20 metres about sea level) which is used for agriculture (a mixture of cattle grazing and banana farming) and hilly undeveloped land (rising from 20 metres to up to 80 metres). All land in the locality is freehold.

History 

Robert Waugh and Robert McArdle explored the area in the 1880s. Robert Waugh settled in the area and it is named Waugh Pocket after him. Waugh was a farmer who served as a councillor on the Cairns Divisional Board.

References

External links 

Cairns Region
Localities in Queensland